Efflatounaria is a genus of soft corals in the family Xeniidae.

Species
The World Register of Marine Species lists the following species:

Efflatounaria alba Verseveldt, 1977
Efflatounaria nana Hickson, 1931
Efflatounaria tottoni Gohar, 1939

References 

Xeniidae
Octocorallia genera